St Edward's Church is a Church in Wales church in Penylan, Cardiff, South Wales. It is a daughter church of St Margaret's Church, Roath, the only one remaining in use after the closure of St Anne's in 2015.

History

Structure of 1915

A product of the Oxford Movement, St Edward's was originally constructed in 1915, as a tin tabernacle, one of several in Cardiff at the time. The original structure unconventionally faced the west (rather than the east as is usual in churches). It opened in March 1915. On 11 September 1919, between midnight and 1 am, the church was almost completely destroyed by a fire, believed to have been caused by an electrical fault. Although the church was reduced to a wreck, many of the objects inside survived the blaze, including the communion vessels and 240 chairs. The remains of the building were demolished in 1919.

Structure of 1919

The Parish of Roath decided to reconstruct the building in memory of the fallen of the First World War. A chancel of brick with sandstone embellishments was built by Willmott and Smith, but funds ran short, causing the nave to be constructed of galvanised iron. The new structure, unlike its predecessor, faced the east. A new organ, lectern, and vestments were soon provided. The large east window was added in later years, and the pulpit was added in 1953, having been salvaged from All Souls Chapel in Cardiff Docks, which had closed in 1952.

Reconstruction of 1968

By the late 1960s, the iron nave of the church had fallen into a poor condition. In 1968, it was removed and replaced in brick by the original architects of the 1919 structure (though the brick nave was somewhat shorter than the tin one).

Extension of 1992

In 1992, a brick extension to the church was added, providing a small vestibule, a washroom and a schoolroom. Previously the Sunday school had been held in the vestry.

Bell
After the 1919 rebuilding, a bell was installed in 1922. This had been made in 1815, and is thought to have been made from a cannon used in the Battle of Waterloo. In 2015, the bell was taken down during repairs to the chancel, but was found to be in a very poor condition, and the church could not comfortably afford the repair bill. It was duly put into storage. In 2016, it was replaced with a smaller bell (dating from 1816).

Activities
St Edward's has a long musical tradition. It has its own resident orchestra and holds a music festival each October. It has also houses exhibitions of art and drama performances.

Gallery

References

External links
 St Edward's Church webpage

Roath
Rebuilt church buildings in Wales
Roath, St Edward
Churches completed in 1915
Christian organizations established in 1915